The 2011 South Carolina Gamecocks football team represented the University of South Carolina in the 2011 NCAA Division I FBS football season. The Gamecocks were led by seventh-year head coach Steve Spurrier and played their home games at Williams-Brice Stadium. They are a member of the East Division of the Southeastern Conference and finished 11-2 for the season and 6–2 in SEC play.  While they finished undefeated against the East Division, a 13-16 loss to Auburn and a 28-44 loss to Arkansas left them second in the division standings behind Georgia.  In the Capital One Bowl, they defeated Nebraska 30–13.  The 11 wins were a school record; it was only the second time in the school's 119-year football history that it won as many as 10 games.  They also finished eighth in the final Coaches' Poll and ninth in the final AP Poll—their first-ever top-10 finishes in any major poll.

Preseason
On April 10, 2011, the Garnet squad defeated the Black squad, 21–17, in the annual Garnet & Black Spring Game, in front of a crowd of 30,100.

Schedule

Game summaries

East Carolina

Georgia

Navy

Vanderbilt

Auburn

Kentucky

Mississippi State

Marcus Lattimore was injured during this game and he remained out for the remainder of the season.

Tennessee

Arkansas

Florida

The Citadel

Clemson

Capital One Bowl

Players

Depth chart 
Projected starters and primary backups versus Clemson on November 26, 2011.

Awards
 Antonio Allen – AP Second-Team All-SEC; AP Second-Team All-American
 A.J. Cann – Coaches SEC All-Freshman Team
 Jadeveon Clowney – Coaches Second-Team All-SEC; Coaches SEC All-Freshman Team; SEC Freshman of the Year; Sporting News All-Freshman Team
 Bruce Ellington – SEC Co-Freshman of the Week, 10/17/11; Coaches SEC All-Freshman Team
 Melvin Ingram – Walter Camp National Defensive Player of the Week, 9/11/11; SEC Special Teams Player of the Week, 9/12/11; SEC Defensive Player of the Week, 9/26/11; SEC Defensive Player of the Week, 10/3/11; AP & Coaches First-Team All-SEC; AFCA All-American Team; Walter Camp First-Team All-American; AP First-Team All-American; Sporting News All-American Team
 Alshon Jeffery – AP Second-Team All-SEC; Capital One Bowl MVP
 Marcus Lattimore – SEC Co-Offensive Player of the Week, 9/19/11; AP & Coaches Second-Team All-SEC
 Mike Matulis – Sporting News All-Freshman Team
 Travian Robertson – SEC Defensive Lineman of the Week, 10/14/11
 Connor Shaw – SEC Offensive Player of the Week, 10/10/11; SEC Co-Offensive Player of the Week, 11/28/11
 D.J. Swearinger – SEC Co-Defensive Player of the Week, 10/17/11
 Rokevious Watkins – SEC Offensive Lineman of the Week, 9/5/11; AP First-Team All-SEC; Coaches Second-Team All-SEC
 Brandon Wilds – SEC Freshman of the Week, 10/31/11
 Dalton Wilson – Capital One Academic All-America Second Team

2011 recruiting class

Rankings

Coaching staff
 Steve Spurrier – Head coach
 Ellis Johnson – Assistant head coach, defensive coordinator
 Lorenzo Ward – Defensive coordinator, cornerbacks coach
 John Butler – Special teams coordinator
 Shawn Elliott – Offensive line coach, running game coordinator
 Craig Fitzgerald  – Strength & conditioning coach
 Jay Graham – Running backs and tight ends coach
 Jeep Hunter – Safeties coach
 Brad Lawing – Defensive line coach
 G.A. Mangus – Quarterbacks coach
 Steve Spurrier, Jr. – Wide receivers coach

References

South Carolina
South Carolina Gamecocks football seasons
Citrus Bowl champion seasons
South Carolina Gamecocks football